Kevin Pina is an American journalist, filmmaker and educator. Pina also serves as a Country Expert on Haiti for the Varieties of Democracy  project sponsored by the University of Notre Dame Center for Research Computing, the University of Gothenburg Department of Political Science, and the Helen Kellogg Institute for International Studies.

Human rights in Haiti 
Pina is known for his reporting focusing on human rights abuses in Haiti following the ouster of Jean-Bertrand Aristide on February 29, 2004 and the installation of the interim government of Gerard Latortue and Boniface Alexandre in March 2004.  Pina reported on events in Haiti between 2003 and 2006  as a Special Correspondent for the radio program, Flashpoints, heard on KPFA – the flagship station of Pacifica Radio based in Berkeley, California.

Kevin Pina began reporting from Haiti in 1991 for the KPFA News in the United States. He reported on human rights violations committed by the Haitian military in the poor neighborhood of Cité Soleil following the coup of September 30, 1991 that was led by Raoul Cédras and Michel François. In late July 1993, he was declared persona non-grata and deported by General Raoul Cedras following a drive-by shooting during an interview with Senator Thomas Eddy Dupiton in Canape Verte.

Pina's first Haiti documentary, Haiti: Harvest of Hope, focused on the formation of Aristide's Lavalas political movement, the military coup of 1991 and Aristide's eventual return from exile in October 1994. The Haitian Creole version of Haiti: Harvest of Hope was narrated by Haitian poet Jean-Claude Martineau and premiered in Haiti on Haitian Mother's Day in May 1995. The English version is narrated by the actor Roscoe Lee Brown and was released for distribution in the U.S. in 1997.

In early January 1999, Pina moved to Port-au-Prince where he lived and worked for the next seven years. He was the first journalist to write that paramilitary forces of the former Haitian military and the Front for the Advancement and Progress of Haïti (FRAPH), operating in the neighboring Dominican Republic, were being used as part of a larger strategy to oust the government of President Jean-Bertrand Aristide in April 2003.

Between 2001 and 2003 Pina was hired as an independent consultant for Télévision Nationale d'Haïti (TNH), a government owned station, to teach camera and digital editing. Pina was contracted concurrently for a similar position with the privately owned station Tele-Haiti in 2003, and later became the Station Manager for Haiti's largest privately owned television station TeleMax in early 2004.

According to Yves Engler and Anthony Fenton in their book Haiti: Waging War on the Poor Majority, Pina was beaten by an off-duty SWAT officer of the Haitian National Police on June 4, 2005. In subsequent interviews, Pina said he believed this was retribution for his actions during a demonstration on May 18, 2005  where he and several Haitian journalists blocked police from firing on unarmed protesters. A Brazilian military commander, working for the United Nations mission in Haiti known as MINUSTAH, gave orders to have Pina's picture taken during the demonstration while threatening, "You are always making trouble for us. I have taken your picture and I am going to give it to the Haitian police. They will get you."

Pina was arrested in Haiti on September 9, 2005 and held in jail for three days after attempting to videotape a search by Judge Jean Pérs Paul in the church of prisoner of conscience Father Gérard Jean-Juste. Pina later said he had gone to St. Claire's parish because he had received information that the judge intended to plant weapons in Jean-Juste's rectory to justify holding the priest in prison.

After Haiti: Harvest of Hope, Pina released a second video entitled Haiti: The UNtold Story. The film chronicles human rights abuses by the Haitian police and a military assault on July 6, 2005 by United Nations forces where residents accuse them of massacring civilians in the impoverished neighborhood of Cité Soleil.  Haiti: The UNtold Story was an earlier version of Pina's latest documentary, Haiti: We must kill the Bandits, subsequently re-edited for a final release in 2009 at the Bahamas International Film Festival.  Although Haiti: We must kill the Bandits recycles rare footage from Pina's earlier documentary Haiti: Harvest of Hope for context, most of the video is original footage shot between 2004-2006.

Body of works 
Pina's film credits and videography include El Salvador: In the Name of Democracy (1985), Berkeley in the Sixties (1990), Amazonia: Voices from the Rainforest (1990), Haiti: Harvest of Hope (1997), Haiti: The UNtold Story (2005) and HAITI: We Must Kill the Bandits (2007).

See also 
 Human rights in Haiti

References

American alternative journalists
American documentary filmmakers
American expatriates in Haiti
American human rights activists
American male journalists
Human rights abuses in Haiti
Living people
Year of birth missing (living people)
American people imprisoned abroad
Prisoners and detainees of Haiti